Warren Albert Cole (15 November 1889 – 29 December 1968), born in Swansea, Massachusetts, was a businessman and lawyer and is known as the founder of Lambda Chi Alpha Fraternity.

Early life and education
Cole was the son of Albert Warren Cole and Mary Horton Nichols. He attended high school at B.M.C. Durfee High School in Fall River, Massachusetts, where he graduated in 1908.  While there, he was a member of Alpha Mu Chi, a fraternity that may have shaped his future views for a collegiate organization. After graduation, a year of work, and a few weeks as a student at Brown University, Cole entered the Boston University School of Law in Boston in 1909, where he became a member of the Gamma Eta Gamma law school fraternity.

Career

Lambda Chi Alpha founding
Cole was viewed as a congenial man, whose dogged persistence was, no doubt, the reason Lambda Chi Alpha succeeded. Cole started several fraternities that never caught on, including: The Lodge, Tombs, and Lambda Pi. After Lambda Pi he founded Lambda Chi Alpha, meaning "Loyal Collegiate Associates" before its name was changed in 1912. Cole graduated from Boston University with a Bachelor of Laws degree in 1912. He then set about the work of continuing to build an international fraternity.  Cole was one of the three founders of Lambda Chi Alpha when it started on November 2, 1909.  

In addition to holding Lambda Chi Alpha’s highest office, he was the administrative and traveling secretary, and the editor and treasurer of Purple, Green, and Gold magazine throughout World War I. During his tenure in office, the Fraternity grew to 53 functioning chapters. Cole resigned his membership in Lambda Chi Alpha during 1920 under allegations of financial irregularities and the alteration of official fraternity documents by other members of the fraternity's governing body. However, in 1957, he was reinstated as a member in good standing.

Personal life
Cole held many different jobs during his lifetime such as store owner, jewelry salesman, an assistant at the Brown University Student Union, member of the Massachusetts Highway Commission, insurance salesman, and as a Pinkerton detective.  He was a member of the Loyal Order of Moose, grand chancellor of the Rhode Island Knights of Pythias, a better than 50-year member of the Pioneer Masonic Lodge in Somerset, Massachusetts, and a member of the National Grange of the Order of Patrons of Husbandry.

He was married twice during his lifetime. He married his first wife on September 13, 1910, and they lived in Boston. They had three children. He married Ethalyn Brayton Chace on August 28, 1919, in Barrington, Rhode Island. Cole had three more children during his second marriage. His two sons, Albert Warren Cole and Nathan Warren Cole, never became Lambda Chi Alpha members.

Cole died on December 29, 1968, in Fall River, Massachusetts. He was buried in a family plot at a cemetery in Rehoboth, Massachusetts in January 1969. His first wife Lottie is buried with him.

A future historic marker is planned for Swansea, Massachusetts, to commemorate Cole.

See also
 History of Lambda Chi Alpha Fraternity

References

External links
 Warren A. Cole: A Brief Biography (Part One)
 Warren A. Cole: A Brief Biography (Part Two)
 Warren A. Cole grave site collection (photos)

1889 births
1968 deaths
Boston University School of Law alumni
Burials in Massachusetts
College fraternity founders
Lambda Chi Alpha
People from Swansea, Massachusetts
B.M.C. Durfee High School alumni